The Ulster is a  river in Thuringia and Hesse, Germany.

The Ulster's source is in the Rhön Mountains, near Ehrenberg. The Ulster flows generally north through the towns Hilders, Tann, Geisa and Unterbreizbach. It flows from the left into the Werra in Philippsthal.

See also
List of rivers of Thuringia
List of rivers of Hesse

References

Rivers of Hesse
Rivers of Thuringia
Rivers of Germany